Parham Airfield Museum is a museum in Framlingham in Suffolk, England. The airfield was named after the village of Parham in Suffolk famously linked to the Aldeburgh poet George Crabbe.

Overview
The museum comprises the 390th Bombardment Group Memorial Air Museum and the Museum of the British Resistance Organisation operating under one Management Committee. Its continued existence relies on volunteer support and donations to help with maintenance necessary to ensure continued preservation of the building and its contents.  It is a wonderful day out for all ages. All of the volunteers are lively and full of information.

390th Bombardment Group Memorial Air Museum
The 390th Bombardment Group Memorial Air Museum is housed in the original World War II control tower of Framlingham Station 153. Exhibits focus on the history of the U.S 8th Air Force, the Royal Air Force and the German Luftwaffe in the Second World War. Displays include recovered Second World War aircraft engines, parts of Allied and German aircraft, uniforms, photographs, documents, combat records, paintings and memorabilia.  The museum opened in 1981.

Museum of the British Resistance Organisation
Opened in 1997, the Museum of the British Resistance Organisation is located in a Quonset hut adjacent to the control tower, and is dedicated to the Auxiliary Units, or as they were officially known ‘Auxunits’.  
 
In case the Germans succeeded in invading Britain, the men and women of the Auxiliary Units were trained to operate as the British underground resistance.  They were to remain undetected in carefully constructed bunkers (Operating Bases 
- OBs) as the invading German Army made its way through Britain.

The museum includes a replica underground Operational Base, as well as photographs, special weapons such as time pencil fuses and other explosives, dead letter boxes, agent instruction papers, and information about the special radio communications network installed by the Royal Corps of Signals.

History of the museum
After World War II in Europe, the Parham Airfield runways were broken up and the buildings were allowed to deteriorate and, when not pulled apart, were used for farm storage. Among them was the control tower, shot up and abandoned after the Americans held a riotous farewell party there in August 1945. Framlingham Station 153, as the 390th bomb group knew the airfield, now stood neglected, windowless and derelict.

In 1976, a small band of determined enthusiasts decided to restore the decaying building as a museum in tribute to the endeavours of the 390th Bomb Group, 8th US Army Air Force and other Allied airmen operating from bases throughout East Anglia during the Second World War.

A five-year restoration programme began, using volunteer labour and funded from their own resources and the Tower was finally dedicated as the 390th Bombardment Group Memorial Air Museum of the USAAF on 13 May 1981 and, since then, has remained in active contact with, and received support from US veterans, their relatives, supporters and Friends.

The Museum of the British Resistance Organisation was created in 1997, with the opening ceremony being carried out by Lieutenant Colonel J.W. Stuart Edmundsun, TD, RE, one of the founders of the nondescript ‘Most Secret’ GHQ.

Auxiliary Units, as they were officially known. The ‘Auxunits’ were one of Britain’s nine secret services of World War II, alongside better known clandestine organisations such as the Security Service (MI5), the Secret Intelligence Service (MI6), and the Special Operations Executive.

References

Sources
 Parham — Bottesford DC

External links

 Parham Airfield Museum website

Museums established in 1981
Museums in Suffolk
Military aviation museums in England
World War II museums in the United Kingdom
1981 establishments in England